Sergi Oliva (born 1984) is a Spanish professional basketball executive and coach who is an assistant general manager for the Portland Trail Blazers of the National Basketball Association (NBA).

Education
Oliva had earned multiple degrees from Polytechnic University of Catalonia, including a PhD in computational complexity in 2013 and both master's and bachelor's degrees in computer science. As a researcher, Oliva worked at Polytechnic University of Catalonia between 2007 and 2013.

Executive career
Oliva joined the Philadelphia 76ers in 2014 as a basketball operations analyst. Through years he got multiple promotions, most recently as vice president of strategy in 2019. He parted ways with the 76ers in October 2020.

On 9 June 2022, Oliva was named an assistant general manager for the Portland Trail Blazers.

Coaching career
While in Catalonia, Oliva spent 12 years as a head coach at the youth level at Club Esportiu Gelida and at the senior level at Club Bàsquet Hortonenc.

On 16 October 2020, Oliva was named an assistant coach for the Utah Jazz under Quin Snyder. In March 2022, The Athletic named him to their 40 under 40 list for NBA executives, coaches and agents shaping the future of the basketball world.

See also
List of foreign NBA coaches

References

External links
Profile at realgm.com

1984 births
Living people
Catalan basketball coaches
Spanish expatriate basketball people in the United States
Sportspeople from Barcelona
People from Alt Penedès
Sportspeople from the Province of Barcelona
Philadelphia 76ers executives
Utah Jazz assistant coaches
Portland Trail Blazers assistant coaches
Polytechnic University of Catalonia alumni
Academic staff of the Polytechnic University of Catalonia